Polygala nuttallii is a species of flowering plant in the milkwort family (Polygalaceae). It is endemic to the United States.

References

nuttallii
Flora of Alabama
Flora of Kentucky
Flora of New York (state)
Flora of Tennessee
Flora without expected TNC conservation status